Palauan English is the dialect of English spoken by the Palauan people.

Phonological features
Palauan English has many features, especially in the phonology, that show the influence of the Palauan language and (to a lesser extent) the Japanese language. It is also influenced by American English.

Consonant variations
Palauan English is rhotic.

The interdental fricatives /θ/ and /ð/ are often realized as [t̪] and [d̪].

Vowel variations
:  = 
:  = 
:  = 
:  = 
:  = 
:  = 
:  = 
:  or  =  or 
:  = 
:  =  or 
:  or  =  or 
:  or  =  or 
:  = 
:  = 
:  = 
:  = 
:  = 
:  = 
:  = 
:  = 
:  =  or 
:  = 
:  = 
:  = 
:  =

References 

Dialects of English
Languages of Palau
Oceanian dialects of English